Klang may refer to :

 Klang, Malaysia, a city and major port in Selangor, Malaysia.
 Klang District, a district which contains the city of Klang, but does not administer it.